Penicillium cremeogriseum is an anamorph species of the genus of Penicillium which produces fulvic acid. Penicillium cremeogriseum was isolated from forest soil in Kyiv, Ukraine.

See also
List of Penicillium species

References

cremeogriseum
Fungi described in 1950